John F. Warren (May 1, 1909 – August 8, 2000) was an American cinematographer. He was nominated for an Academy Award in the category Best Cinematography for the film The Country Girl. Warren died in August 2000 in Camarillo, California, at the age of 91.

Selected filmography 
The Country Girl (1954)
 The Search for Bridey Murphy (1956)

References

External links 

1909 births
2000 deaths
People from Boston
American cinematographers